This is a list of schools in the Shire of Noosa (Noosa) and the Sunshine Coast Region (Sunshine Coast) of Queensland, Australia, including both the urban areas and surrounding hinterland. Prior to 2015, the Queensland education system consisted of primary schools, which accommodated students from kindergarten to Year 6 (ages 4–13), and high schools, which accommodate students from Years 7 to 12 (ages 12–19).

State schools

State primary schools

State high schools and colleges

Other state schools 

This includes special schools (schools for disabled children) and schools for specific purposes.

Defunct state schools

Private catholic schools

In Queensland, Catholic primary schools are usually (but not always) linked to a parish. Prior to the 1970s, most schools were founded by religious institutes, but with the decrease in membership of these institutes, together with major reforms inside the church, lay teachers and administrators began to take over the schools, a process which completed by approximately 1990.

Schools in the Sunshine Coast region are administered by the Catholic Education Office, Archdiocese of Brisbane. The CEO is supported by the Queensland Catholic Education Commission, which is responsible for coordinating administration, curriculum and policy across the Catholic school system. Preference for enrolment is given to Catholic students from the parish or local area, although non-Catholic students are admitted if room is available.

Private Schools

Most independent schools cater for students from preparatory to year 12.

Defunct private schools

Higher education

Universities

See also
List of schools in Queensland
List of schools in Greater Brisbane
List of schools in Wide Bay-Burnett

References

External links
, a directory of Government schools in Queensland. (Department of Education and Training - Queensland Government)
CEO Brisbane
About Independent schools at Independent Schools Queensland.

Sunshine Coast